The Paul Merage School of Business is the business school at the University of California, Irvine (UCI). It is one of the university's 14 academic units. The current Dean is Ian O. Williamson. The school confers Master of Business Administration (MBA) and Doctor of Philosophy (Ph.D.), degrees Master of Accountancy (MPAc) program, Master of Science in Biotechnology Management (MSBTM), Master of Science in Engineering Management (MSEM), and Bachelor of Arts in Business Administration.

History
The school originated as the Graduate School of Administration in 1965 only offering graduate degrees in Master of Science in Administration, Master of Public Administration, and Master of Business and Public Administration. In 1981, the school changed its name to the Graduate School of Management and offered its Master of Business Administration degree. In 1987, the school earns its AACSB accreditation, each year upholding its honors. In 1997, the school was first ranked within the top 50 business schools as reported by the (U.S. News & World Report). In 2005, the Graduate School of Management officially changed its name to The Paul Merage School of Business after entrepreneur and Orange County philanthropist, Paul Merage. The donation by Paul Merage was announced to be $30 million. In the same year, the alumni network reached 5,000.
 In 2007, the school announced that it would offer undergraduate courses starting in fall 2008.

Building 
In January 2015, the School opened its new Platinum-level LEED (Leadership in Energy & Environmental Design) certified building. The 78,000-square-foot Merage School building serves as home to a high-tech 300-seat auditorium, several of the Merage School’s Centers of Excellence, a Charles Schwab Trading and Technology Lab, and a 70-seat Lyman W. Porter Colloquia Room & Executive Terrace. Other features include 70-seat and 90-seat case-study classrooms, a multi-purpose classroom and 20 small group study rooms providing new student learning opportunities, faculty research, community engagement, and facilities and grounds.

Notable alumni
Greg Autry (born 1983)- space advocate and author
 Jillian Kraus (born 1986), water polo player

Rankings

U.S. News & World Report
 2015: Full-Time MBA program ranked #45 nationally; Part-Time MBA program ranked #46 nationally 
 2014: Full-Time MBA program ranked #49 nationally, Part-Time MBA program ranked #31 nationally 

Financial Times
 2015: Full-Time MBA Program ranked #21 among U.S. institutions (#7 among public institutions in the U.S.) and #43 internationally 
 2014: Full-Time MBA Program ranked #25 among U.S. institutions (#9 among public institutions in the U.S.) and #48 internationally 
 2014: Percentage of women faculty ranked 1st in the world 
 2014: Percentage of women students tied for 4th in the U.S. and 16th in the world 

BusinessWeek
 2014: Full-Time MBA program ranked 31st nationally 
 2014: Fully Employed MBA program ranked 43rd nationally 
 2014: Executive MBA program ranked 36th nationally 

Forbes Magazine
 2013: Full-Time MBA program ranked 61st nationally 
 2014: Full-Time MBA program ranked 42nd nationally

See also
 List of business schools in the United States
 Merage family

References

Sources 
 businessweek.com
 merage.uci.edu/
 usnews.com

External links
 University of California, Irvine | Paul Merage School of Business website

Business schools in California
University of California, Irvine
Educational institutions established in 1965
University subdivisions in California
1965 establishments in California